Prime Suspect 1973 (also known as Prime Suspect: Tennison) is a British television detective drama series starring Stefanie Martini as the young Jane Tennison. It is a prequel to the long-running Prime Suspect series that had starred Helen Mirren.

The series debuted on ITV in the UK on 2 March 2017, comprising six episodes. In June 2017, it was confirmed there would be no second series.

Synopsis
Set in Hackney, the series depicts 22-year-old Jane Tennison (Stefanie Martini) as she begins her career as a woman police constable (WPC) in 1973 with the Metropolitan Police Service. At a time when women were beginning to be gradually integrated into the police force, Tennison has to deal with sexism, as well as difficulties in her home life, as her family disapprove of her career choice.

Under the guidance of DI Len Bradfield (Sam Reid), the naive and inexperienced Tennison assists in investigating the murder of a young runaway, Julie-Ann Collins. Meanwhile, criminal Clifford Bentley (Alun Armstrong) is released from prison and, along with other members of his family, is planning a bank heist. Links to Collins's murder threaten to expose the Bentley family's plans.

Cast

Main cast
 Stefanie Martini as WPC Jane Tennison
 Sam Reid as DI Len Bradfield
 Blake Harrison as DS Spencer Gibbs
 Alun Armstrong as Clifford Bentley
 Ruth Sheen as Renee Bentley
 Jessica Gunning as WPC Kath Morgan
 Andrew Brooke as Sergeant Jim Harris

Supporting cast
 Nick Sidi as Andrew Tennison
 Geraldine Somerville as Joyce Tennison
 Geoffrey Streatfeild as George Collins
 Nancy Carroll as Mary Collins
 Rosie Day as Pam Tennison
 Lex Shrapnel as John Bentley
 Jay Taylor as David Bentley
 Jacob James Beswick as Eddie Philips
 Joshua Hill as DC Edwards
 Daniel Ezra as DC Ashton
 Anthony Skordi as Silas Manatos
 Tommy McDonnell as DC Hudson
 Jordan Long as DS Lawrence

Episodes

Production

Development 
The series is produced for ITV by Noho Film and Television, and was adapted by Glen Laker from the novel Tennison, written by original series creator Lynda La Plante. Commissioned by ITV in June 2015 under the working title Tennison, the series was set to be penned by LaPlante, who had also written the original Prime Suspect novels, and contributed to episodes of the long-running television series of the same name.

The announcement of Martini as Jane Tennison, as well as further casting was announced in July 2016. In early 2016, La Plante pulled out of the project. Vera and Home Fires writer Glen Laker was drafted in to write the series.

Filming 
Filming began in July 2016 in London.

Cancellation 
In June 2017, ITV confirmed that the series had not been recommissioned, despite high ratings for the first series. The cause is reported to be creative differences between author Lynda LaPlante and ITV.

Broadcast 
Prime Suspect 1973 first aired on 2 March 2017 on ITV. Internationally, broadcast under the title Prime Suspect: Tennison, the series premiered in South Africa on 6 April 2017 on ITV Choice. The series premiered in the United States on 25 June 2017 on Masterpiece Mystery on PBS, airing over three 90-minute instalments.

Reception 
The series received mixed reviews from critics, achieving a 50% approval rating based on 12 reviews as aggregated on Rotten Tomatoes. Critics praised Stefanie Martini's performance and the period detail, in particular. Upon its broadcast in the United States, the Washington Post recommended it as "one of the best shows you’ll find on TV this summer", while the Los Angeles Times said that "Tennison does not quite measure up to Prime Suspect." In contrast, Salon considered it fortunate that the series was forced into early retirement, and noted that this Tennison prequel failed to focus on Tennison's character development with the same intensity as the "provocative... classic" original did with Helen Mirren's character.

References

External links
 

2017 British television series debuts
2017 British television series endings
2010s British crime television series
2010s British drama television series
British crime drama television series
British detective television series
2010s British television miniseries
English-language television shows
ITV television dramas
Prequel television series
Television series by ITV Studios
Television series set in 1973
Television shows set in London